The 2000 Skate Canada International was the second event of six in the 2000–01 ISU Grand Prix of Figure Skating, a senior-level international invitational competition series. It was held at the Hershey Centre in Mississauga, Ontario on November 2–5. Medals were awarded in the disciplines of men's singles, ladies' singles, pair skating, and ice dancing. Skaters earned points toward qualifying for the 2000–01 Grand Prix Final.

Results

Men

Ladies

Pairs

Ice dancing
The compulsory dance was the Rhumba.

References

Skate Canada International, 2000
Skate Canada International
2000 in Canadian sports 
2000 in Ontario
Sport in Mississauga